Cymothoe hypatha, the large lurid glider, is a butterfly in the family Nymphalidae. It is found in Nigeria, Cameroon, Gabon, the Central African Republic, Angola and the Democratic Republic of the Congo. The habitat consists of primary forests.

The larvae feed on Rinorea species.

Subspecies
Cymothoe hypatha hypatha (Nigeria: Cross River loop, Gabon, Central African Republic, Angola, northern Democratic Republic of the Congo)
Cymothoe hypatha okomu Hecq & Larsen, 1997 (western Nigeria)

References

Butterflies described in 1866
Cymothoe (butterfly)
Butterflies of Africa
Taxa named by William Chapman Hewitson